Gransito Movie Awards 2007

Best Picture:
The Departed

Best Director:
Martin Scorsese

Gransito Movie Awards 2007 is the 7th annual edition of GMA, the first Italian online film award.

Nominees and winners

 Best movie
 Babel (directed by Alejandro González Iñárritu)
 Little Miss Sunshine (directed by Jonathan Dayton and Valerie Faris)
 The Departed  (directed by Martin Scorsese)
 The Prestige  (directed by Christopher Nolan)
 Volver (directed by Pedro Almodóvar)
 Best director
 Pedro Almodóvar (Volver)
 Clint Eastwood (Letters from Iwo Jima)
 Mel Gibson (Apocalypto)
 Alain Resnais (Coeurs)
 Martin Scorsese (The Departed)
 Best actor in leading role
 Christian Bale (The Prestige)
 Leonardo DiCaprio (The Departed)
 Mads Mikkelsen (After the Wedding)
 Clive Owen (Children of Men)
 Forest Whitaker (The Last King of Scotland)
 Best actress in leading role
 Margherita Buy (Saturno contro)
 Penélope Cruz (Volver)
 Judi Dench (Notes on a Scandal)
 Helen Mirren (The Queen)
 Meryl Streep (The Devil Wears Prada)
Best original screenplay
 Babel
 Inside Man
 Lettere da Iwo Jima
 Little Miss Sunshine
 The Queen
 Volver
 Water
Best adapted screenplay
 Borat
 Children of Men
 The Departed
Best Italian movie
 Anche libero va bene  (directed by Kim Rossi Stuart)
 Il caimano  (directed by Nanni Moretti)
 La stella che non c'é  (directed by Gianni Amelio)
 Nuovomondo  (directed by Emanuele Crialese)
 Saturno contro  (directed by Ferzan Ozpetek)
Best actor in supporting role
 Alan Arkin (Little Miss Sunshine)
 Michael Caine (The Prestige)
 Djimon Hounsou (Blood Diamond)
 Jack Nicholson (The Departed)
 Stanley Tucci (The Devil Wears Prada)
Best actress in supporting role
 Seema Biswas (Water)
 Cate Blanchett (Notes on a Scandal)
 Lola Dueñas (Volver)
 Jennifer Hudson (Dreamgirls)
 Carmen Maura (Volver)

Miglior Film Indipendente  (Best independent movie)

- Coeurs (directed by Alain Resnais, Fra)
- La voltapagine (directed by Denis Dercourt, Fra)
- Little Miss Sunshine  (directed by Jonathan Dayton e Valerie Faris, Usa)
- Volver   (directed by Pedro Almodóvar, Spa)
- Water   (directed by Deepa Mehta, Ind/Can)

Miglior Film d'animazione  (Best animated movie)

- Cars  (directed by John Lasseter, Walt Disney/Pixar, Usa)
- Giù per il tubo (directed by Bowers e Fell, DreamWorks/Aardman, Uk/Usa)
- Happy Feet (directed by Miller e Coleman, KingdomFeature/AnimalLogic, Aus/Usa)

Miglior Fotografia  (Best cinematography)

 The Black Dahlia
 Children of Men
 Intrigo a Berlino
 The Prestige
 Water

Miglior Trucco  (Best make-up)

 Apocalypto
 The Devil wears Prada
 Il labirinto del Fauno
 Marie Antoinette
 Pirates of the Caribbean: Dead Man's Chest

Migliori Costumi  (Best costume design)

 Bobby
 The Devil Wears Prada
 Il vento che accarezza l'erba
 Marie Antoinette
 Pirates of the Caribbean: Dead Man's Chest

Migliori Scenografie  (Best set decoration)

 Apocalypto
 Il labirinto del fauno
 Marie Antoinette
 The Prestige
 Water

Migliore Montaggio  (Best editing)

 Babel
 Bobby
 Children of Men
 The Departed
 United 93

Migliore Colonna sonora  (Best soundtrack)

 Babel
 Marie Antoinette
 Romance & Cigarettes
 Saturno contro
 Volver

Migliori Effetti speciali  (Best visual effects)

 The Da Vinci Code
 Pirates of the Caribbean: Dead Man's Chest
 Superman Returns

Miglior Canzone per film  (Best original song)

 "Listen" (Beyoncé Knowles, Dreamgirls)
 "Passione" (Neffa, Saturno contro)
 "Volver" (Estrella Morente, Volver)

Miglior Coppia sullo schermo  (Best on-screen duo)

 Woody Allen & Scarlett Johansson (Scoop)
 Gael Garcia Bernal & Charlotte Gainsbourg (L'arte del sogno)
 Cate Blanchett & Judi Dench (Notes on a Scandal)
 Tom Hanks & Audrey Tautou (The Da Vinci Code)
 Meryl Streep & Anne Hathaway (The Devil Wears Prada)

Sequenza cult (Cult sequence)

 Final sequence in the English senate (V per Vendetta)
 Colors party (Water)
 Penélope Cruz sings Volver (Volver)

Rivelazione femminile  (Breakthrough female performance)

 Ambra Angiolini (actress, Saturno contro)
 Abigail Breslin (actress, Little Miss Sunshine)
 Susanne Bier (director, After the Wedding)
 Laura Chiatti (actress, L'amico di famiglia)
 Carice van Houten (actress, Black Book)

Rivelazione maschile  (Breakthrough male performance)

 Sacha Baron Cohen (actor and screenwriter, Borat)
 Aaron Eckhart (actor, Thank You for Smoking)
 Dito Montiel (director and screenwriter, Guida per riconoscere i tuoi santi)
 Cillian Murphy (actor, Il vento che accarezza l'erba)
 Fabio Volo (actor, Manuale d'amore 2)

Gransito Movie Awards
Gran